Lake Henry is a spring-fed lake of approximately 230m in diameter located in Te Anau, New Zealand. It is located south-east of the main township in Ivon Wilson Park.

Fish and Game Southland release trout into the lake on occasions to enhance it as a fishery for younger anglers.

References

Henry
Te Anau